Gossip Girl Indonesia is an Indonesian teen drama streaming television series developed by Nia Dinata for GoPlay. It is adapted from the American television series Gossip Girl (2007–2012), which is based on a series of books of the same name by Cecily von Ziegesar. The series stars Amanda Rawles as Serena Darsono, Jihane Almira as Blair Hadiningrat, Rayssa Dynta as Jenny Hakim, Bagus Jordy Rizkyanda as Erik Darsono, Baskara Mahendra as Danny Hakim, Jerome Kurnia as Chicco Salim, and Arya Vasco as Nathan Siregar. The story revolves around a group of privileged Jakarta teens and notorious Instagram account @GossipGirl.Indo who watches their every move and becomes the source of all the important news about these raging hormone teens’ scandal.

The series premiered on February 14, 2020.

Cast and characters

Main
 Amanda Rawles as Serena Darsono, a charming it girl and fashion influencer who had just returned from a mysterious absence 
 Jihane Almira Chedid as Blair Hadiningrat, the scheming queen bee who is always jealous of her best friend
 Rayssa Dynta as Jenny Hakim, a junior who is desperate to join Blair's clique 
 Bagus Jordy Rizkyanda as Erik Darsono, younger brother of Serena who's secretly staying in a rehabilitation center after his suicide attempt
 Baskara Mahendra as Danny Hakim, an academically-bright student from Bintaro who hates Serena's glamorous and privileged world
 Jerome Kurnia as Chicco Salim
 Arya Vasco as Nathaniel “Nathan/Nate” Siregar, childhood boyfriend of Blair who's in love with Serena

Recurring
 Aida Nurmala as Ella Hadiningrat, a depressed designer who is extremely critical of her daughter, Blair
 Izabel Jahja as Lily Darsono, mother of Serena and Erik who shares a past with Diki
 Ariyo Wahab as Dicky Hakim, a former poet who owns a gallery. He's a father to Danny and Jenny who recently has been reunited with his love from the past, Lily
 Ralph Tampubolon as Alex Siregar, Nate's father who is committing fraud
 Shelo Mitadiah as Dewi Siregar, Nate's mother and a socialite 
 Marcelino Lefrandt as Alwi Salim, Chicco's father who is having an affair with Lily
 Chanceline Ebel and Yovie Carissa as Jenna and Jedar, the comedical minions of Blair
 Elmo Hill as Armin Rajasa, father of Blair who ran away to Thailand with his lover
 Jajang C. Noer as Bi Inah, The Hadiningrat family's maid
 Tatyana Akman as Vanessa, an old friend of Danny who just returned from Australia

Special guest
 Atiqah Hasiholan as Lisa Hakim, Dicky's wife who is an artist and currently lives in Yogyakarta

Production

Development
The series was announced after GoPlay's launch on September 27, 2019. It is developed by Nia Dinata, who also serves as the showrunner, director, and writer. Realizing that the issues contained in the original series are still relevant in the present day, especially amongst Gen-Z, director Nia Dinata and her team is interested to adapt the series. With the series being localized, some adjustments had been made to relate with recent situations, including the characters' last names and social issues happening to or around them. The series was filmed for a month in December 2019, before releasing the episodes weekly on February 14, 2020.

The second season of Gossip Girl Indonesia was announced on May 8, 2020. Filming officially began in September 2020. However, due to Jakarta's PSBB, the production was stopped and never resumed.

Casting 
On December 19, 2019, it was announced Amanda Rawles, Jihane Almira, Rayssa Dynta, Baskara Mahendra, Jerome Kurnia, Arya Vasco, and Tatyana Akman had joined the series in leading roles as Serena Darsono, Blair Hadiningrat, Jenny Hakim, Danny Hakim, Chicco salim, Nathaniel Siregar, and Vanessa. On January 27, 2020, it was revealed Chanceline Ebel and Yovie Carissa were cast in undisclosed roles as Blair's minions, which later proved to be Jenna and Jeddar, the Indonesian iteration of Isabel Coates and Kati Farkas. Ariyo Wahab, Aida Nurmala, Marcelino Lefrandt, along with Indonesian top-tier actress Jajang C. Noer, and newcomer Izabel Jahja also joined the series in recurring roles, while Bagus Jordy Rizkyanda joined as Erik Darsono. During the 8th and 9th episode, Atiqah Hasiholan made a special appearance as Lisa Hakim, Diki's wife and mother to Danny and Jenny who is currently living in Yogyakarta.

Tissa Biani joined the series' second season as Gina.

References

External links
 
 

Indonesian television series based on American television series
2020 Indonesian television series debuts
2020 television series endings
2020s Indonesian television series
Television series about teenagers
Television shows based on American novels
Indonesian-language television shows
English-language television shows
Gossip Girl
Television series impacted by the COVID-19 pandemic